The 2022–23 RIT Tigers men's ice hockey season was the 59th season of play for the program, the 18th at the Division I level, and the 17th in the Atlantic Hockey conference. The Tigers represented the Rochester Institute of Technology and were coached by Wayne Wilson, in his 24th season.

Season
RIT got off to a good start, beginning the season 10–2 and rocketing to the top of the Atlantic Hockey standings. The Tigers were riding a wave of solid goaltending from Tommy Scarfone paired with a very consistent offense that was averaging nearly 4 goals per game. Carter Wilkie had taken over as the team's primary scorer but the biggest improvement to the offense came from Gianfranco Cassaro and Aiden Hansen-Bukata on the back end. Their pairing provided immediate dividends; Hansen-Bukata eclipsed his career scoring totals by late November while Cassaro was able to accomplish the same feat in just 7 games.

By a quirk of the schedule, 10 of those early games were against conference opponents. This meant that, despite their record, RIT was still outside the top 16 in the PairWise rankings. The Tigers would have several opportunities to demonstrate that they were worthy of a potential at-large bid with the first chance coming against Princeton. While the split that they earned wasn't the worst result, the evened result didn't help their ranking. After returning from their winter break, the Tigers took on #5 Penn State. In their biggest test of the year, RIT was outgunned in the first game, getting outshot 29–47 in a 1–6 loss. While the score was a little better in the rematch, they were still outplayed for most of the game. The defeats showed that the team still had some work to do and would need to perform well in the second half of the season to guarantee themselves a spot in the NCAA tournament. The only saving grace from the Penn State losses is, because the Nittany Lions were ranked so high, RIT only fell to 23 in the rankings.

January proved to be kind to the Tigers and the team went 6–0–1 in their next seven games, including a sweep of Arizona State. the streak put the team 12 games above .500 and, more importantly, into the top 15 of the Pairwise for the first time since week 4. After the games with the Sun Devils, RIT had a very easy slate of games with all games coming against Atlantic Hockey opponents and each being in the bottom half of the standings.

In what should have been a comfortable stretch, RIT went 2–5 with a similar issue rearing its head. RIT had made a habit of taking penalties throughout the year. The team was good enough to survive without allowing too many power play goals but the amount of time they spent defending meant that the Tigers weren't a threat to score. Even when they weren't short-handed, the Tigers were taking match penalties and several key players were getting ejected. The losses didn't affect RIT's position in the standings, as they had already built a huge lead, however, it the did drop the Tigers back into the low-20s in the PairWise.

As they began their postseason run, RIT knew that it had to win the conference tournament if it was going to make an NCAA tournament appearance. Fortunately, as the top seed, they would face the lowest-seed at each stage of the tournament. Additionally, Atlantic Hockey had decided to hold all tournament games at team sites, meaning that the Tigers would play at home for the duration of their run.

After dispatching Mercyhurst in straight sets, the Tigers got a welcome surprise when7th-seeded Holy Cross was their next opponent. The Tigers were expected to make quick work of the Crusaders, however, a stellar performance from Jason Grande sent both teams into overtime without a goal between them. Liam McLinskey ended the game 8 minutes into the extra session and put the Tigers' backs to the wall. Luckily, Atlantic Hockey had changed the playoff format for that season, converting the semifinal round into a best-of-three series. The rematch started out in RIT's favor with the team taking the lead twice, however, the Tigers got into penalty trouble in the second period and suddenly found themselves behind. Cassaro ties the match with his 14th of the year and the two goalies then battled to a stalemate for the remainder of regulation, leading to a second overtime match. The winning marker took nearly the same amount of time to be generated as the first, however, this time the Tigers were on the winning side of the leger thanks to Elijah Gonsalves. With a winner-take-all game in front of them, RIT had a sluggish start and took two penalties before 5 minutes had elapsed. To make matters worse, Wilkie received a match penalty for kneeing and was removed from the game after just 10 minutes. Holy Cross netted the first marker with about three minutes remaining in the opening frame but RIT had a chance to tie with a power play to end the period. Instead of capitalizing on their opportunity, RIT could only watch as Holy Cross scored a short-handed goal and ended the period with a 2-goal advantage. The game tightened up in the second and the teams traded goals but the Tigers were never really able to get back into the match. RIT couldn't overcome the disastrous 1st period and two empty-net goals sealed their fate.

Departures

Recruiting

Roster
As of July 18, 2022.

Standings

Schedule and results

|-
!colspan=12 style=";" | Regular Season

|-
!colspan=12 style=";" |

Scoring Statistics

Goaltending statistics

Rankings

Note: USCHO did not release a poll in weeks 1, 13, or 26.

References

2022–23
RIT Tigers
RIT Tigers
2023 in sports in New York (state)
2022 in sports in New York (state)